Baron Pehr Adlerfelt (1680–1743) was brother of Gustaf Adlerfelt. In 1712 he was made colonel in the Swedish army and in 1720 was made a baron and in 1739 a member of the Riksrad (Council of the Kingdom).

He died in 1743 while defending Stockholm against the Dalecarlians.

Sources
Svenskt biografiskt handlexikon

Swedish Army colonels
Swedish nobility
1680 births
1743 deaths
Caroleans